The Government Shipping Office is an agency in the Government of Pakistan that registers and manages sailors in the Pakistan Merchant Navy. The Government Shipping Office was first established in 1923 under the Merchant Shipping Act. It was a subordinate office of the then-Ministry of Communications, now reorganised as the Ministry of Ports and Shipping, under the administrative control of Ports and Shipping Wing, Karachi.

Purpose
The objective of Government Shipping Office is to administer various provisions of the Merchant Shipping Act, 1923 (now replaced with Merchant Shipping Ordinance, 2001) and Rules made there under, and to execute Government directives and ILO conventions within the orbit of the Merchant Shipping Ordinance, 2001. The principal function of the Office is to supply crew to all Pakistani and foreign ships, issue Seaman Service Book (SSB), previously Continuous Discharge Certificate (CDC) and to maintain roster of seamen.

Functions
The functions of Government Shipping Office relate to:
Registration and facilitation of Pakistani Seamen
Issue of Seaman Service Book (SSB) and issue of Seafarers’ Identity Document (SID)
Engagement of Seamen on Ships and Discharge of seamen from ships
Maintains record of service of seamen

Ports & Shipping Wing Karachi has since long been facing acute shortage of staff, its sub-ordinate and attached department are functioning below strength of manpower.  Besides, Mercantile Marine Department, the Government Shipping Office is working with its 14 vacant slots of officials of different ranks.

Shipboard Employment policy
Pakistan's merchant marine policy for jobs on vessel set in 2001, speaks as follows:

Issuance of SSB
To obtain employment on board a seagoing vessel every citizen of Pakistan is entitled to acquire a Seaman Service Book in accordance with the provision of Merchant Shipping Ordinance 2001 subject to fulfilling the requirements as set-in under the Rules issued from time to time, by the Government of Pakistan. SSB is issued from National Database Registration Authority (NADRA) after following prescribed procedure and deposit of fee. One of the sources of getting SSB in the category of ship's ratings/crew is conduct of courses from private sector institutions.

Prior to 1990 the Pakistan government was practicing a policy for issuance of CDC (now SSB) only to a certain number per year in order to ensure the availability of jobs to each and every seamen holding CDC under roster system. The promulgation of Merchant Shipping Ordinance (2001) contains provisions which imparts authority to institutions in private sector to offer training to semen for issuance of SSB according to their qualification. After coming into force of Merchant Shipping Ordinance, 2001,  private institutes started their business of training-cum-education to prospective seamen. There are five maritime colleges in Karachi, Professional Maritime Studies (PROMTEE), Nautical Institute, Reycon, Maritime Training Centre, and in Public sector the Pakistan Maritime Academy, while one operates in Lahore, all these colleges get their operations’ license from Ministry of Ports and Shipping, Ports & Shipping Wing, Karachi. Pakistan Seamen Union discloses that there were nearly 50,000 seafarers and holder of SSB/Old System CDC, most of them had no jobs. Institutes have been charging between Rs.70,000 and Rs.80,000 for six-month training without ensuring shipboard jobs of their students, which causing a surplus in the already over-saturated job market.

See also
Pakistan Merchant Navy
Shipping Master
Pakistan Merchant Shipping Ordinance 2001
Ministry of Maritime Affairs(Pakistan)

References

Pakistan federal departments and agencies
Shipping in Pakistan
Pakistan Merchant Navy
1948 establishments in Pakistan
Government agencies established in 1948
Ministry of Maritime Affairs (Pakistan)